Food Factory is a Canadian television series produced by Cineflix airing in that country on the Food Network, and in the United States on National Geographic, Quest, and FYI. The show features the industrial production lines of major food companies, mostly in Canada, but also in the United States, and occasionally in other countries.  It is co-narrated by Colleen Rusholme and Todd Schick.

Episodes

Season 1 (2012)

Season 2 (2013)

Season 3 (2013-2014)

Season 4 (2014-15)

Season 5 (2015)

Season 6 (2016-17)

Food Factory USA
Between the original program's third and fourth seasons, the first season of Food Factory USA was produced for FYI and featured only U.S. factories.  The style of the show, including the theme music, text graphics, and two narrators, is identical to the original three seasons of Food Factory.  However, the format is somewhat different, catering to the demands of American programmers by eliminating one of the four segments to make room for more TV commercials, and putting those commercials in the middle of each of the three remaining segments instead of between them. In addition, each break is preceded by a trivia question related to the segment, whose answer is given following the break (similar to other series such as Pawn Stars).  In the spring of 2015, a second season began airing on May 23, two at a time each week as with season four of Food Factory.  The only noticeable difference is the use of graphical text in various colors (consistent within each episode), instead of the silvery grey used in all four previous seasons of the two series.

In the FYI telecasts, Food Factory USA also uses only US customary units, instead of the metric system measurements used in the original three Food Factory seasons.  Those seasons, as seen on Food Network Canada (as well in the United States as FYI and its predecessor, Bio), used metric measurements in the narration, with the FYI broadcasts also including metric with English conversions in the graphics.  As aired in the U.S., the fourth season of Food Factory has no metric units of any kind (narration, graphics, or captions), but the closed captioning still uses Canadian spelling.

Home Factory
Also in May 2015, a true spinoff began airing in the U.S. on FYI.  Home Factory is nearly identical to the original series, except that its products are non-food items found in and around the home, ranging from towels and brooms to rubber ducks and lawn flamingos.

See also
How It's Made

References

External links
 Food Factory - Episode Guide locatetv.com
 

2012 Canadian television series debuts
Television series by Cineflix
Documentary television series about industry
Food Network (Canadian TV channel) original programming
2010s Canadian documentary television series